Alberto Cavallari (1 September 1927, in Piacenza20 July 1998, in Levanto) was an Italian journalist and writer.

Biography 
The son of storekeeper Enrico (Piacenza, 1894–1972) and housewife Dirce Bongiorni (Casa Celli di S. Lazzaro, 1900Piacenza, 1969), he had an elder brother, Oreste. In 1954 he married Maria Teresa Astorri, with whom he had two sons: Paolo and Andrea.

He began his career founding the magazine Numero, (1945–1946), on which artists Ennio Morlotti, Emilio Vedova and others published the Manifesto del Realismo (also known as Oltre Guernica), and collaborating with Italia Libera (1945), official newspaper of Partito d'Azione, Corriere Lombardo (1947) and Libertà, a newspaper of Piacenza. 
Later he worked for the magazine Epoca (as a copy editor, 1950–1953), for the newspapers Corriere della Sera (as a reporter, 1954–1969) and Il Gazzettino, Venice (as editor in chief, 1969–1970). In 1971 Cavallari was a political commentator for TG2 (television news) (1971). After being head of the Rome office of Europeo (1972–1973), he became correspondent from Paris for La Stampa (1973–1975) and Corriere della Sera (1977–1981). He was the editor in chief of Corriere della Sera in the period 1981–1984, when the newspaper was involved in the investigations on the P2 Masonic Lodge; and political commentator for La Repubblica from 1984 until his death in 1998.

Cavallari taught journalism at the Panthéon-Assas University (1978–1989) and held numerous seminars at the University of Pavia. In 1984, he became a member of the European Institute for the Media, first at the University of Manchester, and then at the University of Düsseldorf.

In 1965, Cavallari published, in Corriere della Sera, an inquiry about the Vatican Council II, which culminated, on 3 October, with an interview with Paul VI, the first ever issued by a Pope.

He covered his own life in an autobiography published in the Autodictionary of the Italian writers.

Books 

it L'Europa intelligente, Rizzoli, Milano 1963; survey on science and politics.
it L'Europa su misura, Vallecchi, Firenze 1963; essay on economic planning in Western Europe.
it La Russia contro Kruscev, Vallecchi, Firenze 1964; travel diary in Russia in the aftermath of Khrushchev's fall; translated into Spanish, Edtores Plaza and Janes, Barcelona 1965.
it (With I.Montanelli, P. Ottone, G. Piazzesi and G. Russo) Italia sotto inchiesta, Corriere della Sera, 1963–1965, Sansoni, Firenze 1965.
Il Vaticano che cambia, Arnoldo Mondadori Editore, Milano 1966; an overview of the Vatican structure including the first interview in history to a Pope; translated into English, Faber & Faber, London 1966; American, Doubleday & Co, New York 1967; Portuguese, Livraria Morais, Lisbon 1967; Spanish, Plaza and Janes, Barcelona 1967; Dutch, Ultgeverij Lannoo, The Hague 1967; Spanish, Ediciones GP, Barcelona 1971.
it M.A. Asturias e S. Pautasso) Incontro con Miguel Angel Asturias, IILA, Roma 1973.
it Il potere in Italia, Arnoldo Mondadori Editore, Milano 1967; the Italian political life portrayed through interviews to Italian political figures.
it Una lettera da Pechino, Garzanti, Milano 1974 e 1976, ; diary of a trip through China in 1973.
it La Cina dell'ultimo Mao, Garzanti, Milano 1975 e 1976, ; a revealing journey through the third China following the cultural revolution and the new constitution of 1975.
it La Francia a sinistra, Garzanti, Milano 1977, ; chronicle of political changes and social and cultural life in France in the 1970s.
it Vicino & lontano, Garzanti, Milano 1981, ; an anthology of chronicles on social, economical and political facts having occurred during the years 79–81.
 (With EG Wedell and Luyken GM) Media Competition: The future of print and electronic media in 22 Countries, European Institute for the Media, Manchester and InterMedia Centrum, Hamburg, 1986, .
it La fuga di Tolstoj, Giulio Einaudi Editore, Torino 1986, Garzanti, Milano 1994,  and Skira, Milano 2010, :complete reconstruction of the flight of the Russian writer in the days just preceding his death. Translated into French, Christian Bourgois, Parigi 1989, 2010, ; Editions 10/18, Paris 1996, Spanish and Catalan, Ediciones de la Magrana, Barcelona 1989 • ; Ediciones Peninsular, Barcelona 1997, . After this text was adapted the play "The Kreutzer Sonata", written and staged in 2009, Spain by Quim Lecina.
it La fabbrica del presente, Feltrinelli, Milano 1990, ; lectures on "Public Information"  held at the University of Paris 2 and at the University of Pavia in the 1980s.
it L'atlante del disordine, Garzanti, Milano 1994, the geopolitical crisis of the century, translated into Norwegian Hegland Trykkeri AS, Oslo 1994, ISBN 978 -82-91165-04-2.
it La Forza di Sisifo, a cura di Marzio Breda, Aragno Editore, Torino 2011, ; collection of chronicles, reports, surveys, interviews and commentaries.

Translations, guardianship and other texts:

it Dalla pittura ai fumetti, by L. Hogben, Arnoldo Mondadori Editore, Milano 1952.
 Since 1980 has worked for "Affari Esteri" magazine sponsored by the Ministry of Foreign Affairs and by 'Italian Association for the Study of Foreign Policy.
it Sabbioneta: una stella e una pianura, con P. Carpeggiani, R. Tardito, S. Mazzoni, O. Guaita, L. Sarzi Amade, Cassa di Risparmio delle Provincie Lombarde, Milano 1985.
 Preface of the book Cartoline lametta by Giuseppe Novello, Rosellina Archinto Editore, Milano 1987, .
it Autodizionario degli scrittori italiani, edited by F. Piemontese, Leonardo Editore, Milano 1990, pp. 98–99. .
it Robinson Crusoe, by D. Defoe, Casa Editrice Feltrinelli, Milano 1993, ; with an introductory text entitled The Island of modernity, pp. 7–29.

Prizes

 Premio Saint-Vincent di giornalimo (1960)
 Premio Marzotto per il giornalismo (1963)
 Premio Palazzi (1963)
 Premio Estense (1965)
 Lions d'Oro – Lions Club Piacenza (1966)
 Premio giornalistico "Alfio Russo" – Giara d'argento (1979)
 Premio Internazionale "La Madonnina" (1984)
 Premio Acqui Storia – Testimone del Tempo (1988)
 Colomba d'oro per la Pace – Archivio per il Disarmo (1989)
 Premio giornalistico Federico Motta Editore (1996)
 Premio "Angil dal Dom" – Fondazione di Piacenza e Vigevano (1996)

See also

 List of Italian writers
 List of Italian journalists
 List of Milanese people

References

External links

 
it Alberto Cavallari, Il Natale dei fessi e dei furbi.
it Alessio Altichieri, "Corriere", l'importanza di un maestro.
it Marzio Breda, Cavallari, la verita' contro il potere.
it Claudio Magris, Alberto Cavallari, un cronista con l' artiglio dello scrittore.
it Roberto Martinelli, profilo di Alberto Cavallari , Ordine dei Giornalisti della Lombardia.
it Bernardo Valli, La fierezza gentile di un grande inviato.
it Sandro Viola, L'ultimo Tolstoj.
fr Emmanuel F. La fuite de Tolstoj
it Marzio Breda, Uno straniero nel paese delle ideoligie.

1927 births
1998 deaths
20th-century Italian writers
20th-century Italian male writers
Broadcast news analysts
Academic staff of Paris 2 Panthéon-Assas University
Italian expatriates in France
Italian columnists
Italian magazine editors
Italian newspaper editors
Italian male journalists
Italian political writers
People from Piacenza
Journalists from Milan